John Marshall Huber (April 26, 1908 – January 31, 1964) was an American Negro league pitcher in the 1940s.

A native of Lexington, Kentucky, Huber made his Negro leagues debut in 1941 for the Philadelphia Stars. He went on to play for the Chicago American Giants, Birmingham Black Barons, and Memphis Red Sox, and finished his career in 1947 with the Indianapolis Clowns. Huber died in Hartselle, Alabama in 1964 at age 55.

References

External links
 and Seamheads

1908 births
1964 deaths
Birmingham Black Barons players
Chicago American Giants players
Indianapolis Clowns players
Memphis Red Sox players
Philadelphia Stars players
Baseball pitchers
Baseball players from Lexington, Kentucky
20th-century African-American sportspeople